Cephalochrysa is a genus of flies in the family Stratiomyidae.

Species
Cephalochrysa africana (Lindner, 1935)
Cephalochrysa albisquama (Enderlein, 1914)
Cephalochrysa australis (Bigot, 1859)
Cephalochrysa bigoti (Lindner, 1968)
Cephalochrysa calopa (Bigot, 1879)
Cephalochrysa canadensis (Curran, 1927)
Cephalochrysa chrysidiformis (Lindner, 1937)
Cephalochrysa demeijerei (Lindner, 1937)
Cephalochrysa ferruginea (Enderlein, 1914)
Cephalochrysa flava (Lindner, 1968)
Cephalochrysa flavomarginata Speiser, 1920
Cephalochrysa fortunata (Lindner, 1966)
Cephalochrysa gracilis James, 1962
Cephalochrysa hovas (Bigot, 1859)
Cephalochrysa infuscata James, 1950
Cephalochrysa lapida (Lindner, 1966)
Cephalochrysa lata (Lindner, 1966)
Cephalochrysa lucens (Lindner, 1968)
Cephalochrysa matilei (Lindner, 1979)
Cephalochrysa maxima (Bezzi, 1928)
Cephalochrysa nigra James, 1962
Cephalochrysa nigricornis (Loew, 1866)
Cephalochrysa rufibasis (Walker, 1860)
Cephalochrysa rugulosa James, 1962
Cephalochrysa sapphirina (Walker, 1849)
Cephalochrysa similis (James, 1936)
Cephalochrysa stenogaster James, 1939
Cephalochrysa stigmatica (Wulp, 1898)
Cephalochrysa texana (Melander, 1904)
Cephalochrysa triste (Lindner, 1966)
Cephalochrysa turbidum (Lindner, 1965)
Cephalochrysa vadoni (Lindner, 1966)

References

Stratiomyidae
Brachycera genera
Taxa named by Kálmán Kertész
Diptera of Africa
Diptera of Asia
Diptera of Australasia
Diptera of North America